Xipapillomavirus is a genus of viruses, in the family Papillomaviridae. Bovine serve as natural hosts. There are five species in this genus. Diseases associated with this genus include: true papillomas on the cutaneous or mucosal surfaces of cattle.

Taxonomy
The following five species are assigned to the genus:
 Xipapillomavirus 1
 Xipapillomavirus 2
 Xipapillomavirus 3
 Xipapillomavirus 4
 Xipapillomavirus 5

Structure
Viruses in Xipapillomavirus are non-enveloped, with icosahedral geometries, and T=7 symmetry. The diameter is around 52-55 nm. Genomes are circular, around 7kb in length. The genome has 6 open reading frames.

Life cycle
Viral replication is nuclear. Entry into the host cell is achieved by attachment of the viral proteins to host receptors, which mediates endocytosis. Replication follows the dsDNA bidirectional replication model. DNA-templated transcription, with some alternative splicing mechanism is the method of transcription. The virus exits the host cell by nuclear envelope breakdown.
Bovine serve as the natural host. Transmission routes are contact.

References

External links
 ICTV Report Papillomaviridae
 Viralzone: Xipapillomavirus

Papillomavirus
Virus genera